Pedro Alegre Arrizabalaga (born 15 August 1961 in Irun, Gipuzkoa) is a Spanish sprint canoer who competed in the mid-1980s. He finished ninth in the K-1 1000 m event at the 1984 Summer Olympics in Los Angeles.

Notes

References

External links
 
 
 
 

1961 births
Living people
Spanish male canoeists
Olympic canoeists of Spain
Canoeists at the 1984 Summer Olympics
Sportspeople from Irun
20th-century Spanish people